Sarv Bad (also Romanized as Sarv Bād; also known as Sīrūbād, Shūrābād, and Sarvābād) is a village in Khusf Rural District, Central District, Khusf County, South Khorasan Province, Iran. At the 2006 census, its population was 358, in 80 families.

References 

Populated places in Khusf County